Ankhkheperure-Merit-Neferkheperure/Waenre/Aten Neferneferuaten was a name used to refer to a female pharaoh who reigned toward the end of the Amarna Period during the Eighteenth Dynasty. Her gender is confirmed by feminine traces occasionally found in the name and by the epithet Akhet-en-hyes ("Effective for her husband"), incorporated into one version of her nomen (birth name) cartouche. She is distinguished from the king Smenkhkare who used the same throne name, Ankhkheperure, by the presence of epithets in both cartouches. She is suggested to have been either Meritaten or, more likely, Nefertiti. If this person is Nefertiti ruling as sole pharaoh, it has been theorized by Egyptologist and archaeologist Dr. Zahi Hawass that her reign was marked by the fall of Amarna and relocation of the capital back to the traditional city of Thebes.

General chronology

There is no broad consensus as to the succession order of Smenkhkare and Neferneferuaten. The period from the 13th year of Akhenaten's reign to the ascension of Tutankhaten is very murky. The reigns of Smenkhkare and Neferneferuaten were very brief and left little monumental or inscriptional evidence to draw a clear picture of political events. Adding to this, Neferneferuaten shares her prenomen (throne name) with Smenkhkare, and her nomen (birth name) with Nefertiti/Neferneferuaten Nefertiti making identification very difficult at times. With little dated evidence to fix their reigns with any certainty, the order depends on how the evidence is interpreted. Many encyclopedic sources and atlases will show Smenkhkare succeeding Akhenaten on the basis of tradition dating back to 1845, and some still conflate Smenkhkare with Neferneferuaten. The lack of unique names continues to cause problems in books and papers written before the early 1980s: an object might be characterized as bearing the name of Smenkhkare, when if in fact, the name was "Ankhkheperure", it could be related to one of two people.

As illustrated in a 2011 Metropolitan Museum of Art symposium on Horemheb, the general chronology of the late Eighteenth Dynasty is:

Aidan Dodson proposes that Smenkhkare did not have an independent reign and thus, Neferneferuaten must have come after him, the result being that Smenkhkare's reign is entirely that of a coregent, ending about a year later, in Year 14 or 15 of Akhenaten's reign, with little firm evidence to argue against it. Gabolde cites the Smenkhkare wine docket to support the idea that Smenkhkare must have succeeded Akhenaten. Finally, Allen has used the wine docket and strong association of Neferneferuaten with Akhenaten in her epithets and on stelae to speculate that both may have succeeded Akhenaten, with one as a rival king. An Allen-Dodson hybrid could see Tutankhamun succeeding Akhenaten directly as rival to Neferneferuaten. There are almost as many theories and putative chronologies as there are Egyptologists interested in the period.

The recently discovered inscription for Nefertiti as Great Royal Wife in regnal Year 16 makes it clear she was still alive and still queen, which could be seen as supporting her candidacy as Neferneferuaten and direct succession to Akhenaten. On the other hand, advocates for Smenkhkare make the case that since she is attested as queen just before the start of Akhenaten's final regnal year, then Smenkhkare is more likely to be Akhenaten's direct successor.

Regardless of the order, Neferneferuaten's successor seems to have denied her a king's burial based on items originally inscribed with her name but utilised for the burial of Tutankhamun. In the reign of Horemheb, the reigns of the Amarna Period pharaohs from Akhenaten to Ay were expunged from history as these kings' total regnal years were assigned to Horemheb. The result is that 3,300 years later, scholars would have to piece together events and even resurrect the players bit by bit with the evidence sometimes limited to palimpsest.

Manetho
Manetho was a priest in the time of the Ptolemies in the third century BC. His lost work Aegyptiaca (History of Egypt), now known only in fragmentary form from later writers quoting his work, is the sole ancient record available as a result of the suppression of the Amarna kings. Manetho's Epitome, a summary of his work, describes the late Eighteenth Dynasty succession as "Amenophis [Amenhotep III] for 30 years 10 months", then "his son Orus for 36 years 5 months". Orus is often seen as a corruption of the name Horemheb, with the length of the entire Amarna Period attributed to him, but others see Orus as Akhenaten. Next comes "his daughter Acencheres for 12 years 1 month then her brother Rathotis for 9 years". Acencheres is Ankhkheperure according to Gabolde, with a transcription error converting 2 years, 1 month into the 12 years, 1 month reported (Africanus and Eusebius cite 32 and 16 years for this person). Most agree that Rathotis refers to Tutankhamun; therefore, the succession order also supports Acencheres as Ankhkheperure. Inexplicably, Manetho states that Rathotis is followed by "his son Acencheres for 12 years 5 months, his son Acencheres II for 12 years 3 months", which demonstrates the limits to which Manetho may be relied upon.

Key evidence

Unlike Smenkhkare, there are no known named depictions of Neferneferuaten; she is only securely attested in inscriptions. Of particular interest is the lid of a box (Carter 001k) inscribed with the following:

The most definitive inscription attesting to Neferneferuaten is a long hieratic inscription or graffito in the tomb of Pairi (TT139) written by a scribe named Pawah:
Regnal year 3, third month of Inundation, day 10. The King of Upper and Lower Egypt, Lord of the Two Lands Ankhkheperure Beloved of Aten, the Son of Re Neferneferuaten Beloved of Waenre. Giving worship to Amun, kissing the ground to Wenennefer by the lay priest, scribe of the divine offerings of Amun in the Mansion [temple] of Ankhkheperure in Thebes, Pawah, born to Yotefseneb. He says: "My wish is to see you, O lord of persea trees! May your throat take the north wind, that you may give satiety without eating and drunkenness without drinking. My wish is to look at you, that my heart might rejoice, O Amun, protector of the poor man: you are the father of the one who has no mother and the husband of the widow. Pleasant is the utterance of your name: it is like the taste of life . . . [etc.] "Come back to us, O lord of continuity. You were here before anything had come into being, and you will be here when they are gone. As you caused me to see the darkness that is yours to give, make light for me so that I can see you . . . "O Amun, O great lord who can be found by seeking him, may you drive off fear! Set rejoicing in people's heart(s). Joyful is the one who sees you, O Amun: he is in festival every day!" For the Ka of the lay priest and scribe of the temple of Amun in the Mansion of Ankhkheperure, Pawah, born to Yotefseneb: "For your Ka! Spend a nice day amongst your townsmen." His brother, the outline draftsman Batchay of the Mansion of Ankhkheperure.

Nicholas Reeves sees this graffito as a sign of a "new phase" of the Amarna revolution, with Ankhkheperure Neferneferuaten "taking a decidedly softer line" toward the Amun priesthood. Therefore, Neferneferuaten might have been the Amarna-era ruler who first reached an accommodation with the Amun priests and reinstated the cult of Amun—rather than Tutankhamun as previously thought—since her own mortuary temple was located in Thebes, the religious capital of the Amun priesthood and Amun priests were now working within it. However, Egypt's political administration was still situated at Amarna rather than Thebes under Neferneferuaten's reign.

There are several stele depicting a king along with someone else—often wearing a king's crown—in various familiar, almost intimate scenes. All of them are unfinished or uninscribed and some are defaced. These include:
An unfinished stele (#17813, Berlin) depicts two royal figures in a familiar, if not intimate, pose. One figure wears the double crown, while the other wears a headpiece which is similar to that from the familiar Nefertiti bust, but is the Khepresh or "blue crown" worn by a king. Aidan Dodson cites this stele to support the idea that Nefertiti may have acted as coregent, as indicated by the crown, but not entitled to full pharaonic honors such as the double cartouche.

Berlin 25574 depicts what clearly seems to be Akhenaten and Nefertiti wearing her flat top headpiece. They are accompanied by four empty cartouches—enough for two kings, one of which seems to have been squeezed in. Reeves sees this as an important item in the case for Nefertiti. When the stele was started, she was queen and thus portrayed with the flat top headpiece. She was elevated to coregent shortly afterward and a fourth cartouche was squeezed in to accommodate two kings.
 Flinders Petrie discovered seven limestone fragments of a private stele in 1891, now in the Petrie Museum, U.C.410 sometimes called the Coregency Stela. One side bears the double cartouche of Akhenaten alongside that of Ankhkheperure mery-Waenre Neferneferuaten Akhet-en-hyes ("effective for her husband"), which had been carved over the single cartouche of Nefertiti.

The clues may point to a female coregent, but the unique situation of succeeding kings using identical throne names may have resulted in a great deal of confusion.

A number of items in Tutankhamun's tomb (KV62) were originally inscribed for Neferneferuaten. Among them Carter 261p(1), a stunning gold pectoral depicting the goddess Nut. Other items include the stone sarcophagus, mummy wrappings, royal figurines; canopic items (chest, coffinettes, and jar stoppers), various bracelets and even shabti figures. Some items are believed to have been at least originally intended for a woman based on the style even when a name cannot be restored.Egyptologist Nicholas Reeves has suggested that even the famous gold mask may have originally been intended for Neferneferuaten since her royal name in a cartouche, Ankhkheperure, was found partly erased, on Tutankhamun's funerary mask.

Female king

For some time the accepted interpretation of the evidence was that Smenkhkare served as coregent with Akhenaten beginning about year 15 using the throne name Ankhkheperure. At some point, perhaps to start his sole reign, he changed his name to Ankhkheperure Neferneferuaten. An alternative view held that Nefertiti was King Neferneferuaten; in some versions she is also masquerading as a male using the name Smenkhkare.

Things remained in this state until the early 1970s when English Egyptologist John Harris noted in a series of papers, the existence of versions of the first cartouche that seemed to include feminine indicators. These were linked with a few items including a statuette found in Tutankhamun's tomb depicting a king whose appearance was particularly feminine, even for Amarna art, which seems to favor androgyny.

In 1988, James P. Allen proposed that it was possible to separate Smenkhkare from Neferneferuaten. He pointed out the name 'Ankhkheperure' was rendered differently depending on whether it was associated with Smenkhkare or Neferneferuaten. When coupled with Neferneferuaten, the prenomen included an epithet referring to Akhenaten (such as 'desired of Wa en Re'). There were no occasions where the 'long' version of the prenomen (Ankhkheperure plus epithet) occurred alongside the nomen 'Smenkhkare', nor was the ‘short’ prenomen (without epithet) ever found associated with the nomen 'Neferneferuaten'. Additionally, a feminine 't' glyph is often present in the prenomen, nomen, or epithets. 
Later, the French Egyptologist Marc Gabolde noted that several items from the tomb of Tutankhamun, originally inscribed for Neferneferuaten and initially thought to read "...desired of Ahkenaten" were actually inscribed as Akhet-en-hyes or "effective for her husband". His reading was later confirmed by James Allen.

The use of epithets (or lack of them) to identify the king referenced in an inscription eventually became widely accepted among scholars and regularly cited in their work  although a case for exempting a particular inscription or instance will occasionally be argued to support a larger hypothesis.

Possible sole reign
Allen later showed that Neferneferuaten's epithets were of three types or sets. They were usually in the form of "desired of ...", but were occasionally replaced by "effective for her husband". In a few cases, the names can be followed by 'justified' using feminine attributes. The term 'justified' (maet kheru) is a common indicator that the person referenced is dead; a similar reference associated with Hatshepsut in the tomb of Penyati is taken to indicate she had recently died. Finally, a few of Neferneferuaten's cartouches bear unique epithets not associated with Akhenaten at all. These include "desired of the Aten" and "The Ruler". Allen concluded that the strong affiliation with Akhenaten in the epithets and the number of them made it likely that Neferneferuaten had been his coregent and therefore, preceded Smenkhkare. The "effective..." epithets, then represent a period during which Akhenaten was incapacitated, but may also date from a time after Akhenaten's death. Finally, the less common 'Akhenaten-less' versions represented a period of sole reign for Neferneferuaten.

Allen offers a possible explanation for the use of the same throne name by two successive kings. He suggested that the almost constant references to Akhenaten may be proclamations of legitimacy on the part of Neferneferuaten, with the epithets functioning to assert her as Akhenaten's chosen successor or coregent. This implies there may have been resistance to the choice of Neferneferuaten, resistance was anticipated. This appears to be supported by her funerary items being usurped to deny her a king's burial. He suggests that adoption of the throne name Ankhkheperure by Smenkhkare was "to emphasize the legitimacy of Smenkh-ka-re's claim against that of Akhenaton's "chosen" (/mr/) coregent". That is, a division in the royal house put Smenkhkare on the throne as a rival king to Neferneferuaten. This was offered as a simple and logical reading of the evidence to explain the nature of the epithets, the use of identical prenomens by successive kings and that she was denied a royal burial. With no dated evidence of rival or contemporaneous kings though, it remains conjecture.

Identity of Neferneferuaten
By the late twentieth century, there was "'a fair degree of consensus'" that Neferneferuaten was a female king and Smenkhkare a separate male king, particularly among specialists of the period. Many Egyptologists believe she also served as coregent on the basis of the stela and epithets, although a sole reign seems very likely, given that the Pairi inscription is dated using her regnal years. Opinion is more divided on the placement and nature of the reign of Smenkhkare in relation to her.

Most Egyptologists see the two names to indicate two separate individuals and consider this as the simplest and more likely view. Most name changes in the Amarna period involved people incorporating -Aten into their name or removing an increasingly offensive -Amun element.

The focus now shifts to the identity of Neferneferuaten, with each candidate having its own advocate(s), a debate which may never be settled to the satisfaction of all.

Nefertiti

Even among Egyptologists who advocate for the identification of Nefertiti as Neferneferuaten, the exact nature of her reign can vary. Nefertiti was an early candidate for King Neferneferuaten, first proposed in 1973 by J. R. Harris. The apparent use of a portion of her name made her an obvious candidate even before Neferneferuaten's gender was firmly established. Remains of painted plaster bearing the kingly names of Neferneferuaten found in the Northern Palace, long believed to be the residence of Nefertiti, supports the association of Nefertiti as the king. Nefertiti was in the forefront during her husband's reign and even depicted engaging in kingly activities such as smiting the enemies of Egypt. The core premise is that her prominence and power in the Amarna Period was almost unprecedented for a queen, which makes her the most likely and most able female to succeed Akhenaten.

Until 2012, Nefertiti's last dated depiction was from  Year 12 of Akhenaten's reign, suggesting that she died shortly after. However, she is now known to have still been alive in the second to last year of Akhenaten's reign and still bearing the title of Great Royal Wife, based on an ink inscription dated explicitly to 'Year 16 III Akhet day 15' in a limestone quarry at Dayr Abū Ḥinnis. This inscription would argue against a coregency of more than about a year, if at all, as the inscription attests to Nefertiti's position as Akhenaten's queen just before the start of his final year.

This affects theories proposed by some Egyptologists, such as Aidan Dodson, who see Neferneferuaten as both a coregent of Akhenaten, a sole ruler, and regent or coregent of Tutankhamun. Despite her highest attested year being Year 3, he suggests she counted her regnal years only after Akhenaten's death, a view put forth by Murnane to account for the lack of double dates in the New Kingdom, even when a coregency is known to exist. Dodson then speculates that she may later have shared Tutankhamun's regnal dating, in effect deferring senior status at least nominally to him. He proposes that Neferneferuaten helped guide the reformation in the early years of Tutankhaten and conjectures that the revival of the Amun priesthood is the result of her 'rapid adjustment to political reality'. To support the Nefertiti-Tutankhamun coregency, he cites jar handles bearing her cartouche and others bearing those of Tutankhaten from Northern Sinai.  This is not a view shared by the excavators, who note that sealings and small objects such as bezel rings from many Eighteenth Dynasty royals including Akhenaten, Ay, Queen Tiye, and Horemheb were found, and that "linking Tutankhamun and Neferneferuaten politically, based on the discovery of their names on amphorae at Tell el-Borg, is unwarranted."  Gabolde likewise considered a coregency or regency unlikely.

Van der Perre considers it likely Nefertiti assumed the royal office using the name Neferneferuaten, adopting the throne name briefly used by Smenkhkare in combination with her own name but that the chance of a co-regency period is slim. References to Akhenaten were added to her names as epithets, confirm her legitimacy. The epithets changed over time: initially conferring legitimacy, then linking to the deified deceased king, before finally changing to 'Beloved of Aten' and 'the ruler' late in her reign. Furthermore, it has been suggested that Smenkhkare may also be Neferneferuaten a view still held by a few such as Nicholas Reeves  and until 2004 by Dodson.

The Coregency Stela (UC 410), mentioned earlier, might resolve the question if it were not so badly damaged. The name Neferneferuaten replaced Nefertiti's name on it. How the image of Nefertiti was changed to match the new inscription could settle matters if her image was not missing. If her entire image was replaced it would mean Nefertiti was replaced by someone else called King Neferneferuaten and perhaps that she died. If just a new crown was added to her image, it would argue quite strongly that Nefertiti adopted a new name and title. As it is, the scene seems to be another of the royal family including at least Meritaten. Replacing the name Nefertiti with the name King Neferneferuaten in a depiction of the royal family, still seems to favor Nefertiti as the new king.

The primary argument against Nefertiti has been that she likely died sometime after Year 12, which was the last known dated depiction of her until 2012. However, an inscription discovered in 2012 showed that she was still alive in Year 16. Evidence put forward to suggest she predeceased Akhenaten includes pieces of an ushabti indicating her title at death was Great Royal Wife; wine dockets from her estate declining and ceasing after Year 13; Meritaten's title as Great Royal Wife alongside Akhenaten's name on items from Tutankhamun's tomb indicating she replaced Nefertiti as in that role; the floor of the tomb intended for her shows signs of cuts being started for the final placement of her sarcophagus. A single ushabti for Nefertiti seems scant evidence for her death, given there are about 200 shabti for Akhenaten.  It is possible the two pieces belonged instead to two separate shabtis, one of Nefertiti and the other of Meritaten. Alternately, it may have been a votive placed in the burial of a family member such as Meketaten, at a time before she was elevated.

Meritaten
Meritaten as a candidate for Neferneferuaten seems to be the most fluid, taking many forms depending on the views of the Egyptologist. She had been put forth by Rolf Krauss in 1973 to explain the feminine traces in the prenomen and epithets of Ankhkheprure and to conform to Manetho's description of a Akenkheres as a daughter of Oros. He speculated Meritaten might have ruled with the feminine prenomen ‘Ankh-et-kheperure’ after Akhenaten's death and before Smenkhkare's accession. Smenkhkare then takes the masculine form of her prenomen upon gaining the throne through marriage to her. Although few Egyptologists endorsed the whole hypothesis, many did accept her at times as the probable or possible candidate for a female Ankhkheprure ruling for a time after Smenkhkare's death and perhaps, as regent to Tutankhaten.

The primary argument against Meritaten either as Krauss's pro tempore Ankh-et-kheprure before marriage to Smenkhkare or as Akhenaten's coregent King Neferneferuaten is that she is well attested as wife and queen to Smenkhkare. For her to have later ruled as king means necessarily, and perhaps incredibly for her subjects, that she stepped down from King to the role of King's Wife. This view places Smenkhkare after Neferneferuaten, which requires the Meryre depiction to be drawn 5–6 years after the 'Durbar' depiction it is alongside, and several years after work on tombs had stopped.

The counter to this view comes from Marc Gabolde, who offers political necessity as the reason for Meritaten's demotion. He sees the box (Carter 001k tomb naming her alongside Akhenaten and Neferneferuaten) as depicting Meritaten in simultaneous roles using the name Neferneferuaten as coregent and using her birth name in the role of royal wife to Akhenaten. He has also proposed that the Meryre drawing was executed in advance of an anticipated coronation, which ended up not taking place due to his death. Most recently, he has proposed that Meritaten was raised to coregent of Akhenaten in his final years. She succeeds him as interregnum regent using the name Ankhkheprure. He also identifies her as the queen of the Dakhamunzu affair, with the Hittite prince Zannanza ascending the throne as Smenkhkare. As there is no evidence as to when or where he died nor that he was murdered, Gabolde believes that he completed the trip and died only after becoming king. After his death, she adopts full pharoanic prerogatives to continue to rule as King Ankhkheperure Neferneferuaten. Since Tutankamun was alive and of royal lineage, Meritaten's actions almost certainly must be taken as intending to prevent his ascension. The Smenkhkare/Zannanza version garners little support among Egyptologists. With the presence of Tutankhamun, Miller points out Meritaten "would presumably have needed the backing of some powerful supporter(s) to carry out such a scheme as the tahamunzu episode, one is left with the question of why this supporter would have chosen to throw his weight behind such a daring scheme".

Since Nefertiti has been confirmed to be living as late as Year 16 of Akhenaten's reign however, the Meritaten theory becomes less likely because she would no longer be the most likely living person to be using either the name Neferneferuaten nor "Effective for her husband" as the epithet of a ruling female pharaoh. Secondly, both Aidan Dodson and the late Bill Murnane have stressed that the female ruler Neferneferuaten and Meritaten cannot be the same person. As Dodson writes:
 ...the next issue is clearly her [i.e., Neferneferuaten's] origins. Cases have been made for her being the former Nefertiti (Harris, Samson and others), Meryetaten (Krauss 1978; Gabolde 1998) and most recently Neferneferuaten-tasherit, [the] fourth daughter of Akheneten (Allen 2006). Of these, Meryetaten’s candidature seems fatally undermined by the existence of the KV62 box fragment JE61500, which gives the names and titles of Akhenaten, Neferneferuaten and Meryetaten as clearly separate individuals.William J. Murnane, The End of the Amarna Period Once Again’, Orientalistische Literaturzeitung (OLZ) Vol. 96 (2001), p.21

Neferneferuaten-tasherit
In 2006, James Allen proposed a new reading of events, suggesting that Neferneferuaten was Akhenaten and Nefertiti's fourth daughter, Neferneferuaten-tasherit. The evidence presented in favour of this identification is solely based on her name.
The primary element in the nomen of a pharaoh always corresponds to the name he (or she) bore before coming to the throne; from the Eighteenth Dynasty onward, epithets were usually added to this name in the pharaoh’s cartouche, but Akhenaten provides the only example of a complete and consistent change of the nomen’s primary element, and even he used his birth name, Amenhotep, at his accession. The evidence of this tradition argues that the coregent bore the name Neferneferuaten before her coronation, and since it now seems clear that the coregent was not Nefertiti, she must have been the only other woman known by that name: Akhenaten’s fourth daughter, Neferneferuaten Jr.
Allen explains the 'tasherit' portion of her name may have been dropped, either because it would be unseemly to have a King using 'the lesser' in their name, or it may have already been dropped when Nefertiti died. This theory is the only  one that does not rely on someone changing their name in some awkward fashion to assume the role of Neferneferuaten. Akhenaten's choice of her as coregent remains a mystery. She is a less attractive candidate now that the Year 16 graffito for Queen Nefertiti has been verified.

Neferneferuaten-tasherit's age is the first objection often raised. She is thought to have been about ten at the time of Akhenaten's death, but Allen suggests that some daughters may have been older than generally calculated based on their first depicted appearance. Their first appearance may have been on the occasion of being weaned at age three; Neferneferuaten-tasherit may have been as old as 13 by the end of Akhenaten's reign. The later use of the "effective..." epithets may indicate that she too, was eventually old enough to act as wife to her father, supporting the older age. However, a younger age need not disqualify her, since Tutankhaten ascended the throne at a similar age, but a ten-year-old girl seems unlikely to many.

Reuse of Neferneferuaten's funerary equipment for Tutankhamun's burial

According to Nicholas Reeves, almost 80% of Tutankhamun's burial equipment was derived from Neferneferuaten's original funerary goods, including his famous gold mask, middle coffin, canopic coffinettes, several of the gilded shrine panels, the shabti-figures, the boxes and chests, the royal jewelry, etc. In 2015, Reeves published evidence showing that an earlier cartouche on Tutankhamun's famous gold mask read, "Ankheperure mery-Neferkheperure" or (Ankheperure beloved of Akhenaten); therefore, the mask originally was made for Nefertiti, Akhenaten's chief queen, who used the royal name Ankheperure when she assumed the throne after her husband's death.

This development implies that either Neferneferuaten was deposed in a struggle for power, possibly deprived of a royal burial—and buried as a queen—or that she was buried with a different set of king's funerary equipment—possibly Akhenaten's own funerary equipment—by Tutankhamun's officials since Tutankhamun succeeded her as king.

Summary
There is also little that can be said with certainty about the life and reign of Ankhkheperure Neferneferuaten. Most Egyptologists accept that she was a woman and an individual apart from Smenkhkare. Many specialists in the period believe the epigraphic evidence strongly indicates she acted for a time as Akhenaten's coregent. Whether she reigned before or after Smenkhkare depends on the underlying theory as to her identity.

Based on the Pairi inscription dated to her third regnal year, it appears she enjoyed a sole reign. How much of her reign was as coregent and how much as sole ruler, is a matter of debate and speculation. The same tomb inscription mentions an Amun temple in Thebes, perhaps a mortuary complex, which would seem to indicate that the Amun proscription had abated and the traditional religion was being restored toward the end of her reign. Since much of her funeral equipment was used in Tutankhamen's burial, it seems fairly certain she was denied a pharaonic burial by her successor. The reasons for this remain speculation, as does a regency with Tutankhaten.

With so much evidence expunged first by Neferneferuaten's successor, then the entire Amarna period by Horemheb, and later in earnest by the kings of the Nineteenth Dynasty, the exact details of events may never be known. The highly equivocal nature of the evidence often renders it suggestive of something, while falling short of proving it. The various steles, for instance, strongly suggest a female coregent but offer nothing conclusive as to her identity.

References

Further reading
Each of the leading candidates have their own proponents among Egyptologists, whose work can be consulted for more information and many more details for a given candidate. Several of the works of Nicholas Reeves and Aidan Dodson advocate for Nefertiti as Neferneferuaten. Marc Gabolde has written several papers and at least one book (in French) supporting Meritaten. James Allen's previous work in this area primarily dealt with establishing the female gender of Neferneferuaten and then as an individual apart from Smenkhkare. His paper on "The Amarna Succession" is his first theory as to identity of King Neferneferuaten, having previously cited Nefertiti or Meritaten as the probable or possible identity depending on the state of the evidence.

 Aldred, Cyril,  Akhenaten, King of Egypt (Thames & Hudson, 1988).
 
 
 
 Dodson, Aidan and Hilton, Dyan. The Complete Royal Families of Ancient Egypt. Thames & Hudson. 2004. 
 Dodson, Aidan. Amarna Sunset: Nefertiti, Tutankhamun, Ay, Horemheb, and the Egyptian Counter-Reformation. The American University in Cairo Press. 2009, 

 Gabolde, Marc, Under a Deep Blue Starry Sky in "Causing His Name to Live: Studies in Egyptian Epigraphy and History in Memory of William J. Murnane"; Gabolde - Starry Sky
 Giles, Frederick. J., Ikhnaton Legend and History (1970, Associated University Press, 1972 US)
 Giles, Frederick. J.  The Amarna Age: Egypt (Australian Centre for Egyptology, 2001)
 Hornung, Erik, Akhenaten and the Religion of Light, translated by David Lorton, Cornell University Press, 1999)
 Miller, Jared; Amarna Age Chronology and the Identity of Nibhururiya in the Light of a Newly Reconstructed Hittite Text (2007); Altoriental. Forsch. 34 (2007) 2, 252–293
 Redford, Donald B., Akhenaten: The Heretic King (Princeton University Press, 1984)
Redford, Donald B.;Akhenaten: The Heretic King (1984) Princeton University Press
 Reeves, C. Nicholas., Akhenaten, Egypt's False Prophet (Thames & Hudson, 2001).
 Reeves, C. Nicholas., The Complete Tutankhamun: The King, the Tomb, the Royal Treasure. London: Thames & Hudson, 1 November 1990,  (hardcover)/ (paperback)
 
 Theis, Christoffer Der Brief der Königin Daḫamunzu an den hethitischen König Šuppiluliuma I. im Lichte von Reisegeschwindigkeiten und Zeitabläufen, in: Thomas R. Kämmerer (Hrsg.): Identities and Societies in the Ancient East-Mediterranean Regions. Comparative Approaches. Henning Graf Reventlow Memorial Volume (= AAMO 1, AOAT 390/1). Münster 2011, S. 301–331
 Tyldesley, Joyce. Nefertiti: Egypt's Sun Queen. Penguin. 1998. 

1330s BC deaths
14th-century BC births
14th-century BC Pharaohs
14th-century BC women rulers
Atenism
Historical negationism in ancient Egypt
Pharaohs of the Eighteenth Dynasty of Egypt
Female pharaohs
Nefertiti